"I'll Be Your Baby Tonight" is a 1967 song by Bob Dylan first released on John Wesley Harding. It features Pete Drake on pedal steel guitar, and two other Nashville musicians, Charlie McCoy on bass guitar and Kenneth Buttrey on drums, both of whom had appeared on Dylan's previous album, Blonde on Blonde.

Dylan first performed the song in concert at the Isle of Wight Festival with the Band on August 31, 1969. Since then, he has included it in more than 400 live performances. "I'll Be Your Baby Tonight" has been covered by many artists, including Robert Palmer with UB40 in 1990.

Robert Palmer and UB40 version

In 1990, Robert Palmer and UB40 released a cover version of the song. It was released as a single in the United Kingdom and throughout Europe. It appears on Robert Palmer's albums Don't Explain and on the 1995 best of The Very Best of. The song was successful, particularly in Australia, Austria, the Netherlands and Switzerland, reaching the top 10 in these countries, and it also secured a number-six placing in both the United Kingdom and Ireland. It was most successful in New Zealand, where it reached number one for a week in February 1991.

Track listings
 7-inch single
 "I'll Be Your Baby Tonight" – 3:26
 "Deep End" – 4:33

 CD single
 "I'll Be Your Baby Tonight" – 3:26
 "Deep End" – 4:33

 CD maxi
 "I'll Be Your Baby Tonight" – 3:30
 "I'll Be Your Baby Tonight" (extended version) – 7:25
 "Deep End" – 4:33

 12-inch single
 "I'll Be Your Baby Tonight" (extended version) – 7:25
 "I'll Be Your Baby Tonight" – 3:30
 "Deep End" – 4:33

Charts

Weekly charts

Year-end charts

See also
List of European number-one airplay songs of the 1990s

References

External links
 Lyrics at Official Bob Dylan site

1967 songs
1990 singles
Songs written by Bob Dylan
Bob Dylan songs
Burl Ives songs
Judy Rodman songs
Number-one singles in New Zealand
Robert Palmer (singer) songs
UB40 songs
Song recordings produced by Bob Johnston
EMI Records singles
MTM Records singles